Lee Ji-hyun (born October 12, 1983) is a South Korean actress and singer.  She debuted in 1998 in the girl band Circle and then joined Jewelry in 2001. She left Jewelry in 2006 and became a host and actress, saying she had not been prepared to be a singer.

Career

2000–present: Career beginnings, debut with Jewelry and departure from Star Empire Entertainment

In her teenage years, she studied at Kyoongi University when she was 17, she was discovered at the Star Empire Entertainment and later she became a trainee when her mom attended her dance classes this following month.

In 2000, Lee and the other 3 members debuted as a member of Jewelry, after finding success of the worldwide girl group nations in South Korea, On 2006, The agency announced that Lee's contract was expired and she decided to leave the group.

In 2006, she was now a host television and as an actress, She acted dramas as Tomorrow Victory and A Good Day To Love.

Filmography

Television series

Variety show

References 

1983 births
Jewelry (group)
Living people
South Korean female idols
South Korean actresses
South Korean women pop singers
Myongji University alumni